Polystigma fulvum is a plant pathogen infecting almonds.

References

Fungal tree pathogens and diseases
Fruit tree diseases
Phyllachorales